Edward Eugene Loomis (April 2, 1864July 11, 1937) was President of the Lehigh Valley Railroad from 1917 to 1937.

Biography
He was born on April 2, 1864, in  German Flatts, New York, to Chester Loomis (1831–1904) and Lydia Esther Norton (1838–1906).

He went to work in the law department of the Denver and Rio Grande Western Railroad. He then worked in the office of the general superintendent of the Erie Railroad. In 1894 he was made superintendent of the Tioga County, Pennsylvania, division of the Erie Railroad. He was then manager of the Blossburg Coal Company. In 1898 he was appointed general superintendent of the New York, Susquehanna and Western Railway and of the Wilkes-Barre and Eastern Railroad. In 1899 the Delaware, Lackawanna and Western Railroad under William Haynes Truesdale was reorganized and Loomis was hired.

He was president of the Lehigh Valley Railroad from 1917 to 1937.

He died on July 11, 1937, at his summer home, Holiday Farm, in Murray Hill, New Jersey.

Other positions
Loomis was a trustee of the American Surety Company. He was director of three New York banks: Liberty National Bank, the Chatham and Phenix Bank and the Coal and Iron National Bank. An executor of the estate of Samuel L. Clemens, he was president and director of the Mark Twain Company. He was director of the Temple Iron Company and of Prizma. He was treasurer and director of the Moses Taylor Hospital and director of the Playground and Recreation Association of America. He was president and director of the Harlem Transfer Company, vice-president and director of the Morris and Essex Railroad, vice-president and director of the Hoboken Ferry.

Memberships
He was a member of the American Institute of Mining, Metallurgical, and Petroleum Engineers, the Chamber of Commerce of the State of New York, the Metropolitan Club, the Recess Club, the Railroad Club of New York, the Westmoreland Club of Wilkes-Barre, Pennsylvania, the Scranton Club of Scranton, Pennsylvania, the Country Club of Scranton and of the Baltusrol Golf Club.

References

1864 births
1937 deaths
Lehigh Valley Railroad people
20th-century American railroad executives
Burials in New York (state)